The Hits is a remix album of recordings by Amii Stewart released in the United Kingdom in 1985. A double A-side single with the remixed versions of "Knock On Wood" and "Light My Fire" reached #7 on the UK charts, followed by a re-issue of "You Really Touched My Heart" (#89). Stewart also re-recorded her 1981 duet "My Guy"/"My Girl" with American bassist and singer Deon Estus. 
The album and the remixes included have since been re-issued on a large number of mid-price compilations.

Track listing
Side A
"Knock on Wood" (1985 Remix, Edited Version) - 4:10 
"You Really Touched My Heart" (1985 Remix, Edit) - 4:15 
"137 Disco Heaven" (1985 Remix) - 2:46 
"Paradise Bird" (1985 Remix) - 5:18 
"My Guy"/"My Girl" (1985 Version, duet with Deon Estus) - 4:33

Side B 
"Light My Fire" (1985 Remix, Edited Version) - 3:56 
"Only a Child in Your Eyes" (1985 Remix) - 3:02 
"Step Into the Love Line" (1985 Remix) - 4:00 
"Ash 48" (Dub Version Of "Knock On Wood") (1985 Remix) - 2:12 
"Jealousy" (1985 Remix) 5:53

Personnel
 Amii Stewart - vocals
 Barry Leng  - backing vocals, guitar
 Charles Augins  - backing vocals
 Gerry Morris  - backing vocals
 Jimmy Chambers  - backing vocals
 Tony Jackson   - backing vocals 
 Gerry Morris - bass guitar
 Adrian Shepard - drums 
 Alan Murphy - guitar 
 Ian Hughes - keyboards
 Ken Freeman - keyboards
 Pete Amesen - keyboards
 Simon May - keyboards 
 Glyn Thomas - percussion

Production
Barry Leng: Original production / Production

Remix
Barry Leng (Side A: Tracks 1-5 / Side B: Tracks 1-4)
Alan Coulthard (Side A: Track 1 / Side B: Track 1)
Dave Hewson (Side A: Track 3 / Side B: Track 4)
Sanny X (Side B: Track 5)

Amii Stewart albums
1985 remix albums
Hansa Records compilation albums